Jhujhar Singh was a Raja of the Orchha region in India during the 17th century.

Jhujhar Singh was the first-born son of Vir Singh Deo and the senior of his three queens. In 1626, he succeeded his father as ruler and determined not to remain a vassal of the Mughal Empire as his father had been. His attempt to assert independence from the reigning emperor, Shah Jahan, led to his downfall. The Mughal army, which was led by the teenager Aurangzeb, conquered his kingdom in 1635 and forced Singh to retreat to Chauragarh.

Death
Jujhar Singh had written a letter to Kok Shah, the Gond king of Deogarh, to let him pass through his territory unharmed and was waiting for an answer at Chauragarh. He heard rumors that king of Deogarh was dead and hence he travelled through his territory toward Golconda. However he and his son were killed by Gonds in the Kingdom of Chanda. Their heads were cut by Khan-i-Dauran and sent to Firoz Jung to be presented to the Mughal emperor Shah Jahan.  The Mughal army recovered treasures worth one crore which Jujhar Singh had hidden in various wells in Deogarh territory.

References 
Citations

Bibliography

17th-century Indian monarchs
History of Madhya Pradesh
Bundelkhand
Orchha